Thompsons is a town in Fort Bend County, Texas, United States, within the Houston–Sugar Land–Baytown metropolitan area. The population was 246 at the 2010 census.

Geography

Thompsons is located south of the Brazos River in east-central Fort Bend County at  (29.486494, –95.605803).

Smithers Lake, an artificial impoundment, along with its associated W.A. Parish Power Plant occupies most of the western half of the town itself. The ETJ of Sugar Land borders the northern end of Thompsons' ETJ; that of Rosenberg is on the west; Missouri City's approaches from the east.

Climate

The climate in this area is characterized by hot, humid summers and generally mild to cool winters.  According to the Köppen Climate Classification system, Thompsons has a humid subtropical climate, abbreviated "Cfa" on climate maps.

Demographics

As of the census of 2000, there were 236 people, 93 households, and 73 families residing in the town. The population density was 38.1 people per square mile (14.7/km2). There were 114 housing units at an average density of 18.4 per square mile (7.1/km2). The racial makeup of the town was 43.64% White, 47.03% African American, 0.85% Native American, 2.12% Asian, 3.81% from other races, and 2.54% from two or more races. Hispanic or Latino of any race were 8.05% of the population.

There were 93 households, out of which 29.0% had children under the age of 18 living with them, 53.8% were married couples living together, 20.4% had a female householder with no husband present, and 21.5% were non-families. 19.4% of all households were made up of individuals, and 6.5% had someone living alone who was 65 years of age or older. The average household size was 2.54 and the average family size was 2.82.

In the town, the population was spread out, with 22.5% under the age of 18, 11.0% from 18 to 24, 26.3% from 25 to 44, 28.8% from 45 to 64, and 11.4% who were 65 years of age or older. The median age was 39 years. For every 100 females, there were 90.3 males. For every 100 females age 18 and over, there were 84.8 males.

The median income for a household in the town was $32,083, and the median income for a family was $32,321. Males had a median income of $38,125 versus $22,222 for females. The per capita income for the town was $29,977. About 20.0% of families and 20.4% of the population were below the poverty line, including 21.4% of those under the age of eighteen and 29.7% of those 65 or over.

Government and infrastructure
The United States Postal Service operates the Thompsons Post Office at 222 Oilfield Road.
The city was first incorporated in 1979 and has a mayor council form of government. The first mayor was mayor G. W. Longserre who was succeeded by current mayor Freddie Newsome.

Government and infrastructure
Fort Bend County does not have a hospital district. OakBend Medical Center serves as the county's charity hospital which the county contracts with.

Education
Thompsons is zoned to Lamar Consolidated Independent School District schools. It is zoned to George Ranch High School.

Gallery

References

External links
 

Towns in Fort Bend County, Texas
Towns in Texas
Greater Houston